Ronald Wallace,  (August 5, 1916 – May 20, 2008) was a Canadian politician and optometrist. Wallace is the longest-serving mayor of the city of Halifax, Nova Scotia.

Wallace was one of fifteen children born to Thomas John Wallace and Ada Evangeline Wallace, formerly MacNeil. He graduated from Saint Mary's University in 1939. He was the intercollegiate boxing champion, and a champion rower. His brother Dan was also a Maritime heavyweight boxing champion and a champion rower, and as a Rhodes scholar and rowed for Oxford University.

Wallace served two terms as the Liberal member for Halifax in the Nova Scotia House of Assembly from 1970 to 1978. He was elected  mayor of Halifax in 1980 and served until his retirement in 1991. He served as mayor longer than any other, and was known for his fairness, good humor and visionary approach to improving his beloved city. He was made a member of the Order of Canada in 2001.

Wallace married Julia Patricia McColough, daughter of Reginald Walker McColough, Director of Public Works for the Parliament of Canada. Together they had six children; Barbara Wallace, Suzanne Wallace, Mary Beth Wallace, Ian Wallace, Mark Wallace and Jennifer Wallace. He died at his home in Halifax on May 20, 2008 at the age of ninety-one after suffering from
cancer and pneumonia.

References

1916 births
2008 deaths
Saint Mary's University (Halifax) alumni
20th-century Canadian businesspeople
Nova Scotia Liberal Party MLAs
Mayors of Halifax, Nova Scotia
Members of the Order of Canada
Canadian optometrists